Hasköy is a town and district in Muş Province of the Eastern Anatolia Region of Turkey. The mayor is Mürsel Özen (AKP).

Demographics 
The main town and two nearby villages are populated by Arabs from the Bidri tribe, while Kurds reside in the other 16 villages. The Bidri tribe knows Arabic and Kurdish. Thousands of Armenians lived in the area before the Armenian genocide in 1915.

References 

Western Armenia
Populated places in Muş Province
Districts of Muş Province
Towns in Turkey

Arab settlements in Turkey
Kurdish settlements in Turkey